Master Kilby (Roud 1434) is a traditional English folk song.  It was collected by Cecil Sharp and Maud Karpeles in 1909.  It has been arranged by Benjamin Britten

Recordings
  John Wesley Harding; Trad Arr Jones
  Nic Jones:  From The Devil To A Stranger (1978), also on Unearthed - Nic Jones (released 2001)
  Anne Hills and Cindy Mangsen  Never Grow Old 1994

References

1909 songs
English folk songs
Songwriter unknown